The Markham Centennial Centre is a 2,300-seat arena located in Markham, Ontario, north of Toronto.

The facility was originally built in 1972 as a 1,800-seat arena, and in 1999 renovations were made which expanded beyond the arena.

Arena
The arena was home to the Markham Waxers junior team in the OPJHL, and also occasionally hosted the Toronto Marlboros of the Ontario Hockey League in the mid 1970s. Beginning in 2015 the arena became home ice for the Markham Royals, which succeeded the Waxers at the city's OPJHL team.

The ice rink surface is NHL regulation size with seating around most of the rink.

Community Centre

The expansion in 1999 added additional facilities:

 bocce / squash courts / basketball practice rooms
 Gym
 Program Room
 Pool Training Room
 Meeting rooms 
 indoor swimming pool - lap pool and children's pool

An outdoor skate park is located to the west of the community centre across from the ice rink along with two baseball fields (with concrete seating behind home plate) and a soccer pitch (with seating on one side).

Transportation
The arena is located across the street from Markville Shopping Centre and has access to GO Transit's train station on McCowan Road.

Toronto Transit Commission 129 McCowan North and GO Train & Bus provides public transit connections to MCC. Parking spaces are found on the east and west sides of the building. GO Centennial's parking structure is for GO commuters only.

Events

In 2015, the facility was to have hosted table tennis events for the 2015 Pan Am Games, but the Games relocated to the newly built Markham Pan Am Centre.

References

 Centennial Community Centre
 The OHL Arena & Travel Guide - Markham Centennial Centre

Indoor arenas in Ontario
Indoor ice hockey venues in Canada
Sports venues in Ontario
Ontario Hockey League arenas
Sport in Markham, Ontario
Buildings and structures in Markham, Ontario
1974 establishments in Ontario
Sports venues completed in 1974